Oleh Maksymovych Serbin (born 11 August 2001) is a Ukrainian diver. He is a 2019 European silver medalist in the 10m synchro event.

Career 

Serbin made his Ukrainian national team debut in 2019, at the age of 17. At the World Championships, he placed 4th in synchronized 10m platform diving with his partner, Oleksiy Sereda.

At the 2019 European Diving Championships, Serbin won a silver medal with Sereda in synchronized diving and placed 6th in individual diving.

Serbin and Sereda were members of the Ukrainian delegation during the 2020 Summer Olympics, ending in sixth place at 400.44 points.

References 

2001 births
Living people
Divers at the 2018 Summer Youth Olympics
Divers at the 2020 Summer Olympics
European Championships (multi-sport event) silver medalists
Olympic divers of Ukraine

Sportspeople from Zaporizhzhia
Ukrainian male divers